Happy We is a Swedish 1983 film directed by Lasse Hallström.

Cast
Brasse Brännström -  Thomas Bengtsson 
Magnus Härenstam - Klasse Wallin 
Pia Green - Anna Wallin 
Lars Amble - Fredrik Wahlgren 
Gösta Engström - Gammal studiekamrat 
Ewa Fröling - Doctor 
Svea Holst - Gammal patient

External links
 

1983 films
Swedish romantic comedy films
Films directed by Lasse Hallström
1980s Swedish films